Qidong may refer to:

Qidong, Jiangsu, formerly Qidong County, county-level city of Nantong, Jiangsu
Qidong (meteorite), a meteorite that fell in Qidong, Jiangsu in 1982

Qidong County, of Hengyang, Hunan